F-117A Nighthawk Stealth Fighter 2.0 is the 1991 remake of the 1988-1990 Cold War combat flight simulator video game F-19 Stealth Fighter by MicroProse, itself a remake of the 1987's Project Stealth Fighter. The original PC version was updated with a corrected aircraft model once the Lockheed F-117 Nighthawk was declassified and with 256-color VGA graphics instead of the original's 16-color EGA, among other changes.

Gameplay
The F-19 of the original game, which was published before the real fighter's specifications became public, carried weapons in four weapons bays. Given that the real stealth fighter's payload capacity fell short of that offered in F-19, the sequel gave players the choice of aircraft: a "realistic" model carrying weapons in only two payload bays, or a variant retaining the four bays of the plane of the first game. In the PC version, both models of fighter resembled the F-117.

The new game introduced new theatres of warfare such as Cuba and Operation Desert Storm (in the wake of the Persian Gulf War, the Iraqis were no longer the allied nation that they had been in the previous game). Missions typically encompassed both primary and secondary targets, selected from a variety of objectives from photographing facilities (one selected weapon would have to be a high resolution camera) to bombing various ground targets. An advanced flight plan editing routine allowed it to adjust waypoints to successfully skirt pulse and doppler ground radar sites; the default flight plan would often take the plane's track into areas where it would be detected. Missions started on the runway of the originating base and ended with the pilot successfully landing at the recovery base. A "time compression" feature allowed the player to speed up the clock during missions.

An improved 3D object rendering system, and 256-color graphics, provided improved target viewing on a remote camera view in the cockpit. Likewise, the player could change viewing angles around the plane, outside the plane, and even reverse target view to see the aircraft passing overhead from the position of the target. This last could also be performed from the vantage point of patrolling enemy fighters.

The game's missions have the player flying at a low altitude, though the actual F-117 mission profile involved launching weapons from high altitude. In keeping with the "stealth" nature of the game, most missions were during nighttime, though a cheat command allowed the player to switch the mission to daytime.

Points per mission were awarded for success or failure, as well as radar and visual detection, and identification, by enemy installations and aircraft. High scores were naturally awarded for entering enemy airspace, accomplishing the primary and secondary mission objectives, and departing, all without being detected by the enemy. The game's manual included in-depth discussion of types of radar detection and how to avoid it, called "threading the needle".

Release
Originally released for the PC DOS in 1991, the game was ported to the Amiga, Macintosh and PC-98 in 1993–1994. Its 3D engine was also optimised and used to create the graphics for Task Force 1942: Surface Naval Action in the Pacific in 1992.

Tommo purchased the rights to this game and digitally publishes it through its Retroism brand in 2015. In October 2014, the game was released on Steam, developed by Retroism and published by Nightdive Studios.

Reception
Computer Gaming World in 1991 called F-117A as engrossing, challenging and educational simulation game. A 1992 survey in the magazine of wargames with modern settings gave the game four stars out of five, and a 1994 survey gave it three-plus stars. The game received the rating of 93% by Computer and Video Games, and scored 92% from Amiga Format. Most of other reviews were less enthusiastic, but usually with the ratings still over 80%.

References

External links

1991 video games
Amiga games
Cold War video games
Combat flight simulators
DOS games
Games commercially released with DOSBox
Linux games
Classic Mac OS games
MicroProse games
NEC PC-9801 games
Video game remakes
Video game sequels
Video games developed in the United States
Video games scored by Jeff Briggs
Video games set in Cuba
Video games set in Iraq
Video games set in Iran
Video games set in North Korea
Video games set in Libya
Video games set in the Soviet Union
Video games set in Vietnam
Single-player video games
Tommo games
Video games set in Syria